Nepenthes justinae is a tropical pitcher plant known only from Mount Hamiguitan on the Philippine island of Mindanao, where it grows at elevations of 1000–1620 m above sea level.

The specific epithet justinae honours Justina Yu, the mayor of San Isidro, Davao Oriental, Mindanao, whose efforts helped get the Mount Hamiguitan Range Wildlife Sanctuary inscribed as a UNESCO World Heritage Site in 2014.

Nepenthes justinae has no confirmed natural hybrids, although certain plants from Mount Hamiguitan may represent crosses involving it and N. hamiguitanensis, N. micramphora, and N. peltata, the three species with which it is sympatric.

References

Carnivorous plants of Asia
justinae
Endemic flora of the Philippines
Flora of Mindanao
Plants described in 2016